MexicanaClick, formerly Click Mexicana, was Mexicana's regional operator, serving most of Mexicana's domestic routes between more than 25 Mexican cities. It was founded as a low-cost carrier, but changed its market to regional operations after its acquisition by Mexicana.  Its main base was Mexico City International Airport.

History
The airline was founded in 1975 and started operations on 12 July 1975 as Aerocaribe. It was formed by Yucatán private investors but was bought by Corporación Mexicana de Aviación on 23 August 1990. It operated regional services under the Mexicana Inter banner using Fairchild FH-227 and Douglas DC-9-30 aircraft (as of January 2005). Mexicana decided to transfer its fleet of Fokker 100 aircraft to Aerocaribe and rebrand the airline, with Click Mexicana starting operations in July 2005. Some services previously operated by Mexicana de Aviación, such as Ciudad del Carmen, Cozumel, and Saltillo, were shifted to Click Mexicana. In December 2005, the Mexicana group, including Click Mexicana, was reprivatised and sold by the Mexican government to Grupo Posadas, a hotel chain.

As part of a restructuring of Mexicana in 2008, it was announced that Click would stop service as a separate low-cost airline and begin serving domestic destinations in Mexico as a regional feeder under the name MexicanaClick. The new airline also started adding to their fleet with Boeing 717 aircraft, which added Business class to the airline.

Click, along with its parent company, ceased operations on 28 August 2010, after filing for bankruptcy earlier in the month. Mexicana and its subsidiaries had stopped selling tickets three weeks prior to the shutdown.

Destinations

Fleet

The MexicanaClick fleet consisted of the following aircraft (as of 15 March 2010):

The airline announced in February 2009, that it would replace its Fokker 100 fleet with 25 Boeing 717-200 aircraft from Midwest Airlines, starting in 2009, with 7 aircraft.

As of 11 March 2009, the average age of the MexicanaClick fleet was 13.3 years.

Cabin
The seats in the entire fleet were made of orange and grey leather. To match the interior there were also orange curtains and a "Click" symbol at the front of the cabin similar to that of the parent company Mexicana.

Incidents and accidents
On February 11, 2010, a MexicanaClick Fokker 100 landed at Monterrey Airport with its landing gear up after pilots reported a malfunction.  The aircraft was bound for Nuevo Laredo, but diverted to Monterrey given its longer runway and better emergency response capabilities.  None of the 96 people on board were injured.

External links 
Mexicana

References 

Airlines established in 2005
Airlines disestablished in 2010
Defunct airlines of Mexico
Latin American and Caribbean Air Transport Association
Defunct low-cost airlines
Former Oneworld affiliate members
Mexicana de Aviación
Regional airlines of Mexico
2010 disestablishments in Mexico
Mexican companies established in 2005